The Glass House is a 2009 Iranian documentary film by Hamid Rahmanian (director and editor) and Melissa Hibbard (producer and script writer). The film is in Persian with English subtitles. The commercially released DVD also has French, German, Spanish, and Arabic subtitles.

The documentary follows four girls who are attempting to pull themselves out of the margins of society by attending rehabilitation center run by Omid Foundation in uptown Tehran.

The Girls 
Samira (14) is taken in by the program after she is found unconscious on the street by the local police. Her mother is in the "business of crystal meth, pills, hashish, [and] opium." She struggles to overcome forced drug addiction.

Mitra (16) lives with her emotionally abusive father and brother. She begins to deal with constant neglect in her creative writing.

Sussan (20) teeters on a dangerous ledge after years of sexual abuse by her brothers.

Nazila (19) works through anger through her music. While Iranian law does not permit female artists to record or perform their music, she is determined to find a way.

Awards 
The movie won the OSCE Human Rights Special Jury Award, the Best Feature Documentary award at Dallas Video Fest, and a Special Mention at the 2010 ZagrebDox.

References

External links 
 http://www.omid-e-mehr.org/theglasshouse.html

 http://edition.cnn.com/video/#/video/showbiz/2009/02/01/namdar.glass.house.cnn

2009 films
2009 documentary films
Iranian documentary films
2000s Persian-language films
Documentary films about women